Cư M'gar is a rural district (huyện) of Đắk Lắk province in the Central Highlands mountainous region of Vietnam. As of 2003, the district had a population of 157,295. The district covers an area of 822 km². The district capital lies at Quảng Phú.

References

Districts of Đắk Lắk province